Mesulergine (developmental code name CU-32085) is a drug of the ergoline group which was never marketed. It acts on serotonin and dopamine receptors. Specifically, it is an agonist of dopamine D2-like receptors and serotonin 5-HT6 receptors and an antagonist of serotonin 5-HT2A, 5-HT2B, 5-HT2C, and 5-HT7 receptors. It also has affinity for the 5-HT1A, 5-HT1B, 5-HT1D, 5-HT1F, and 5-HT5A receptors. The compound had entered clinical trials for the treatment of Parkinson's disease; however, further development was halted due to adverse histological abnormalities in rats. It was also investigated for the treatment of hyperprolactinemia (high prolactin levels).

References

5-HT6 agonists
Abandoned drugs
Dopamine agonists
Ergolines
Prolactin inhibitors
Serotonin receptor antagonists
Sulfamides